Siu Lek Yuen is an area in Sha Tin District, New Territories East. Located to the east of Yuen Chau Kok, the area is surrounded on three sides by the Ma On Shan Country Park. Nowadays it is a residential area.

Name
The name means the origin of small river in Chinese. It is so named because the area situated originally between two rivers.

Geography
Siu Lek Yuen lies at a hill that locates at the east side of Shing Mun River. Therefore, unlike most of the Sha Tin New Town, the land does not come from reclamation.

History
Siu Lek Yuen was originally a ford of Tide Cove, which was reclaimed for the development of Sha Tin New Town. At a result, only Siu Lek Yuen Nullah, a small nullah of the Shing Mun River remained. As part of the New Town, Siu Lek Yuen also underwent a vast change in the years. Originally it was one of the nine districts of Sha Tin, namely, Siu Lek Yuen District, where 14 Hakka villages were there. After the development of Sha Tin New Town, public and private housing estates and factories were built here.

Siu Lek Yuen Village is a recognized village under the New Territories Small House Policy. At the time of the 1911 census, the population of Siu Lek Yuen Village was 174. The number of males was 73.

Housing

Kwong Yuen Estate, a large public housing estate, is at the centre of Siu Lek Yuen. It comprises 6 blocks. Kwong Lam Court and Hong Lam Court are the Home Ownership Scheme courts within Kwong Yuen Estate. Two blocks of Hong Lam Court are used as Government Quarters. Castello is a private housing estate at the north side of Kwong Yuen Estate.

Public Housing Estates
 Kwong Yuen Estate

Home Ownership Scheme
 Kwong Lam Court
 Hong Lam Court (Two blocks are Government Quarters)

Private Housing Estate
 Castello

Education
Siu Lek Yuen is in Primary One Admission (POA) School Net 91. Within the school net are multiple aided schools (operated independently but funded with government money); no government schools are in this net.

Colleges and schools
 Hang Seng University of Hong Kong. Lies at the south-west of Siu Lek Yuen
 Stewards Pooi Kei College
 Shatin Methodist Primary school
 LKWFSL Wong Yiu Nam Primary School

Other facilities

Shopping centre
 Kwong Yuen Shopping Centre

Siu Lek Yuen Industrial Area
 Swire Coca-Cola HK Limited
 Goldlion (Far East) Limited

Others
 Kwong Yuen Estate Market
 Kwong Yuen Community Centre
 Fire station

Transportation

The north entrance of Tate's Cairn Tunnel lies at the southern side of Siu Lek Yuen, making the transportation between Siu Lek Yuen to the East Kowloon much easier.

There are two bus termini in the area: Kwong Yuen Bus Terminus and Wong Nai Tau Public Transport Interchange.

It is a 15–20 minutes walk from the area to City One MTR station or Shek Mun MTR station.

Development
Owing to the decreased demand of industrial lands in Hong Kong, the government plans to re-develop the Siu Lek Yuen Industrial Area. There are plans to convert the factories into office. Hotels are also being built on former industrial area.

References

Further reading

External links

 Delineation of area of existing village Siu Lek Yuen (Sha Tin) for election of resident representative (2019 to 2022)